In English-language punctuation, a serial comma (also called a series comma, Oxford comma, or Harvard comma) is a comma placed immediately after the penultimate term (i.e., before the coordinating conjunction, such as and or or) in a series of three or more terms. For example, a list of three countries might be punctuated either as "France, Italy and Spain" (without the serial comma) or "France,  Spain" (with the serial comma).

Opinions among writers and editors differ on whether to use the serial comma, and usage also differs somewhat between regional varieties of English. British English allows constructions with or without this comma, whereas in American English it is common and sometimes even considered mandatory. The APA style, The Chicago Manual of Style, Garner's Modern American Usage, The MLA Style Manual, Strunk and White's The Elements of Style, and the U.S. Government Printing Office Style Manual recommend or mandate it. By contrast, the Associated Press Stylebook and The New York Times Style Book advise against it. In Canada, the stylebook published by The Canadian Press advises against it. Most British style guides do not mandate its use. The Economist Style Guide notes that most British writers use it only where necessary to avoid ambiguity. A few British style guides mandate it, most notably The Oxford Style Manual (hence the name, "Oxford comma"). However, the University of Oxford Style Guide (2014) advises against its use.

The Oxford Companion to the English Language notes: "Usage varies as to the inclusion of a comma before and in the last item. ... This practice is controversial and is known as the serial comma or Oxford comma, because it is part of the house style of Oxford University Press."

There are cases in which the use of the serial comma can avoid ambiguity, and also instances in which its use can introduce ambiguity.

Arguments for and against 
Common arguments for consistent use of the serial comma:
 Use of the comma is consistent with the conventional practice of the region.
 It can resolve ambiguity (see examples below).
 Its use is consistent with other means of separating items in a list (for example, when semicolons are used to separate items, one is always included before the last item).

Common arguments against consistent use of the serial comma:
 Use of the comma is inconsistent with the conventional practice of the region.
 It can introduce ambiguity (see examples below).
 Where space is at a premium, the comma adds unnecessary bulk to the text.

Many sources are against both systematic use and systematic avoidance of the serial comma, making recommendations in a more nuanced way (see Recommendations by style guides and subsequent sections).

Ambiguity
Omitting the serial comma may create ambiguity. Writers who normally avoid the serial comma often use one when it avoids ambiguity. Consider this apocryphal book dedication:
To my parents, Ayn Rand and God.
There is ambiguity about the writer's parentage, because "Ayn Rand and God" can be read as in apposition to my parents, leading the reader to believe that the writer claims Ayn Rand and God are the parents. A comma before and removes the ambiguity:
To my parents, Ayn Rand, and God.
But lists can also be written in other ways that eliminate the ambiguity without introducing the serial comma, such as by changing the word order or by using other punctuation, or none, to introduce or delimit them (though the emphasis may thereby be changed):
To God, Ayn Rand and my parents.

An example collected by Nielsen Hayden was found in a newspaper account of a documentary about Merle Haggard:
Among those interviewed were his two ex-wives, Kris Kristofferson and Robert Duvall.
A serial comma following "Kris Kristofferson" would help prevent this being understood as Kris Kristofferson and Robert Duvall being the ex-wives in question.

Another example:
My usual breakfast is coffee, bacon and eggs and toast.
It is unclear whether the eggs are being grouped with the bacon or the toast. Adding a serial comma removes this ambiguity:
My usual breakfast is coffee, bacon and eggs, and toast.
In some circumstances using the serial comma can create ambiguity. If the book dedication above is changed to
To my mother, Ayn Rand, and God.
the serial comma after Ayn Rand creates ambiguity about the writer's mother because it uses punctuation identical to that used for an appositive phrase, leaving it unclear whether this is a list of three entities (1, my mother; 2, Ayn Rand; and 3, God) or of only two entities (1, my mother, who is Ayn Rand; and 2, God).

The Times once published an unintentionally humorous description of a Peter Ustinov documentary, noting that "highlights of his global tour include encounters with Nelson Mandela, an 800-year-old demigod and a dildo collector". Again, there is ambiguity as to whether the sentence refers to three distinct entities, or whether Mandela is being described as both a demigod and a dildo collector. The addition of a serial comma would not resolve the issue, as he could still be mistaken for a demigod, although he would be precluded from being a dildo collector.

Or consider
They went to Oregon with Betty, a maid, and a cook.
This is ambiguous because it is unclear whether "a maid" is an appositive describing Betty, or the second in a list of three people. On the other hand, removing the final comma:
They went to Oregon with Betty, a maid and a cook.
leaves the possibility that Betty is both a maid and a cook (with "a maid and a cook" read as a unit, in apposition to Betty). So in this case neither the serial-comma style nor the no-serial-comma style resolves the ambiguity. A writer who intends a list of three distinct people (Betty, maid, cook) may create an ambiguous sentence, regardless of whether the serial comma is adopted. Furthermore, if the reader is unaware of which convention is being used, both versions are always ambiguous.

These forms (among others) would remove the ambiguity:
 One person
 They went to Oregon with Betty, who was a maid and a cook.
 They went to Oregon with Betty, both a maid and a cook.
 They went to Oregon with Betty (a maid and cook).
 They went to Oregon with Betty, their maid and cook.
 Two people
 They went to Oregon with Betty (a maid) and a cook.
 They went to Oregon with Bettya maidand a cook.
 They went to Oregon with Betty, a maid, and with a cook.
 They went to Oregon with the maid Betty and a cook.
 They went to Oregon with a cook and Betty, a maid.
 Three people
 They went to Oregon with Betty, as well as a maid and a cook.
 They went to Oregon with Betty and a maid and a cook.
 They went to Oregon with Betty, one maid and a cook.
 They went to Oregon with a maid, a cook, and Betty.
 They went to Oregon with a maid, a cook and Betty.
 They went with Betty to Oregon with a maid and a cook.

In general
 The list x, y and z is unambiguous if y and z cannot be read as in apposition to x.
 Equally, x, y, and z is unambiguous if y cannot be read as in apposition to x.
 If neither y nor y[,] and z can be read as in apposition to x, then both forms of the list are unambiguous; but if both y and y and z can be read as in apposition to x, then both forms of the list are ambiguous.
 x and y and z is unambiguous if x and y and y and z cannot both be grouped.

Ambiguities can often be resolved by the selective use of semicolons instead of commas; this is sometimes called the "super comma" function of semicolons.

Recommendations by style guides
Wikipedia's Manual of Style leaves use of the serial comma up to the editor: "Editors may use either convention so long as each article is internally consistent. Serial commas are more helpful the more complex the material, such as a list with multi-word items (especially if one contains its own and) or a series of probably unfamiliar terms."

Lynne Truss writes: "There are people who embrace the Oxford comma, and people who don't, and I'll just say this: never get between these people when drink has been taken."

Omitting a serial comma is often characterized as a journalistic style of writing, as contrasted with a more academic or formal style. Journalists typically do not use the serial comma, possibly for economy of space. In Australia, Canada and South Africa, the serial comma tends not to be used in non-academic publications unless its absence produces ambiguity.

It is important that usage within a document be consistent; inconsistent usage can seem unprofessional.

Mainly American style guides supporting mandatory or typical use
The United States Government Printing Office's Style Manual
"After each member within a series of three or more words, phrases, letters, or figures used with and, or, or nor." It notes that an age ("70 years 11 months 6 days") is not a series and should not take commas.
Wilson Follett's Modern American Usage: A Guide (Random House, 1981), pp. 397–401
"What, then, are the arguments for omitting the last comma? Only one is cogent – the saving of space. In the narrow width of a newspaper column this saving counts for more than elsewhere, which is why the omission is so nearly universal in journalism. But here or anywhere one must question whether the advantage outweighs the confusion caused by the omission. … The recommendation here is that [writers] use the comma between all members of a series, including the last two, on the common-sense ground that to do so will preclude ambiguities and annoyances at a negligible cost."
The Chicago Manual of Style, 16th edition (University of Chicago Press, 2010), paragraph 6.18
"When a conjunction joins the last two elements in a series of three or more, a comma … should appear before the conjunction. Chicago strongly recommends this widely practiced usage." In answer to a reader's query, The Chicago Manual of Style Online notes that their style guide has been recommending use of the serial comma ever since the first edition in 1906, but also qualifies this, saying "the serial comma is optional; some mainstream style guides (such as the Associated Press) don't use it. … there are times when using the comma (or omitting it) results in ambiguity, which is why it's best to stay flexible."
The Elements of Style (Strunk and White, 4th edition 1999), Rule 2
"In a series of three or more terms with a single conjunction, use a comma after each term except the last." This has been recommended in The Elements of Style since the first edition by Strunk in 1918.
The American Medical Association Manual of Style, 9th edition (1998) Chapter 6.2.1
"Use a comma before the conjunction that precedes the last term in a series."
The Publication Manual of the American Psychological Association, 6th edition (2010) Chapter 4.03
"Use a comma between elements (including before and and or) in a series of three or more items."
The CSE Manual for Authors, Editors, and Publishers (Council of Science Editors, 7th edition, 2006), Section 5.3.3.1
"To separate the elements (words, phrases, clauses) of a simple series of more than 2 elements, including a comma before the closing 'and' or 'or' (the so-called serial comma). Routine use of the serial comma helps to prevent ambiguity."
Garner's Modern English Usage, 4th edition (Oxford University Press, 2016), "Punctuation," § D, "Comma", p. 748
"Whether to include the serial comma has sparked many arguments. But it's easily answered in favor of inclusion because omitting the final comma may cause ambiguities, whereas including it never will e.g.: 'A and B, C and D, E and F[,] and G and H'."
MLA Style Manual and Guide to Scholarly Publishing (Modern Language Association 2008), paragraph 3.4.2.b
"Use commas to separate words, phrases, and clauses in a series."
AAMT Book of Style for Medical Transcription
"Medical transcriptionists use the serial comma when two medications or diagnoses must be seen as separate; i.e., for 'The patient was on Aspirin, Coversyl, and Dilaudid', the comma is used before 'and' to avoid the reader erroneously thinking that Coversyl and Dilaudid must be taken together."
AIP Style Manual, American Institute of Physics, fourth edition, 1990
"A comma goes before 'and' or 'or' in a series of three or more: Sn, K, Na, and Li lines are invisible."
Plain English Handbook, Revised Edition (McCormick-Mathers Publishing Co., 1959), § 483, p. 78
"Use commas to separate the items in a series of words, phrases, or short clauses:
The farmer sold corn, hay, oats, potatoes, and wheat."

Mainly American style guides opposing typical use
The New York Times stylebook
"In general, do not use a comma before and or or in a series."
The AP Stylebook
"Use commas to separate elements in a series, but do not put a comma before the conjunction in a simple series. […] Put a comma before the concluding conjunction in a series, however, if an integral element of the series requires a conjunction: I had orange juice, toast, and ham and eggs for breakfast. Use a comma also before the concluding conjunction in a complex series of phrases: The main points to consider are whether the athletes are skillful enough to compete, whether they have the stamina to endure the training, and whether they have the proper mental attitude. In the United States, the choice is between journalistic style (no serial comma) and "literary" style (with serial comma); consistent use of the serial comma is usually recommended for college writing."

Mainly British style guides supporting mandatory or typical use
The Oxford Style Manual, 2002
"For a century it has been part of OUP style to retain or impose this last serial (or series) comma consistently, … but it is commonly used by many other publishers both here and abroad, and forms a routine part of style in US and Canadian English. … Given that the final comma is sometimes necessary to prevent ambiguity, it is logical to impose it uniformly, so as to obviate the need to pause and gauge each enumeration on the likelihood of its being misunderstood – especially since that likelihood is often more obvious to the reader than the writer."
MHRA Style Guide (Modern Humanities Research Association), 3rd edition (2013)
"In an enumeration of three or more items, the practice in MHRA journals is to insert commas after all but the last item, to give equal weight to each enumerated element.  … The conjunctions and and or without a preceding comma are understood as linking the parts of a single enumerated element"
But paragraph 5.1 says "The comma after the penultimate item may be omitted in books published by the MHRA, as long as the sense is clear."

Mainly British style guides opposing typical use
The Times style manual
"Avoid the so-called Oxford comma; say 'he ate bread, butter and jam' rather than 'he ate bread, butter, and jam'."
The Economist Style Guide
"Do not put a comma before and at the end of a sequence of items unless one of the items includes another and. Thus 'The doctor suggested an aspirin, half a grapefruit and a cup of broth. But he ordered scrambled eggs, whisky and soda, and a selection from the trolley.
"Sometimes it is essential: compare 'I dedicate this book to my parents, Martin Amis, and JK Rowling' with 'I dedicate this book to my parents, Martin Amis and JK Rowling'."
University of Oxford Public Affairs Directorate Writing and Style Guide
"Note that there is generally no comma between the penultimate item and 'and'/'or' – this is sometimes referred to as the 'Oxford comma'. However, it is essential to use an Oxford comma if required to prevent ambiguity."

Mainly British style guides that consider it generally unnecessary but discretionary
The Guardian Style Guide
"A comma before the final 'and' in lists: straightforward ones (he ate ham, eggs and chips) do not need one, but sometimes it can help the reader (he ate cereal, kippers, bacon, eggs, toast and marmalade, and tea)."
The Cambridge Guide to English Usage
"In British practice there's an Oxford/Cambridge divide … In Canada and Australia the serial comma is recommended only to prevent ambiguity or misreading."
Fowler's Dictionary of Modern English Usage, 4th edition, 2015
"The so-called 'Oxford comma' is an optional comma that follows the penultimate item in a list of three or more items and precedes the word 'and' … The general rule is that it should be used consistently or not at all … However, the Oxford comma can help to avoid ambiguity, ... and it is sometimes helpful to the reader to use an isolated serial comma for clarification, even when the convention has not been adopted in the rest of the text."
New Hart's Rules, 2014
"The general rule is that one style or the other should be used consistently. However, the last comma can serve to resolve ambiguity, particularly when any of the items are compound terms joined by a conjunction, and it is sometimes helpful to the reader to use an isolated serial comma for clarification even when the convention has not been adopted in the rest of the text."

Australian style guides opposing typical use
The Australian Government Publishing Service's Style Manual for Authors, Editors and Printers
"A comma is used before and, or, or etc. in a list when its omission might either give rise to ambiguity or cause the last word or phrase to be construed with a preposition in the preceding phrase. … Generally, however, a comma is not used before and, or or etc. in a list."

Canadian style guides opposing typical use 
Public Works and Government Services Canada Translation Bureau's The Canadian Style: A Guide to Writing and Editing
"Items in a series may be separated by commas:
Complacency, urbanity, sentimentality, whimsicality
They may also be linked by coordinating conjunctions such as and or or:
economists, sociologists or political scientists
the good, the bad and the ugly
Opinions differ on whether and when a comma should be inserted before the final and or or in a sequence. In keeping with the general trend toward less punctuation, the final comma is best omitted where clarity permits, unless there is a need to emphasize the last element in a series."

Individual disputes

Maine labor dispute
In the U.S. state of Maine, the lack of a serial comma became the deciding factor in a $13 million lawsuit filed in 2014 that was eventually settled for $5 million in 2017. The U.S. appeals judge David J. Barron wrote, "For want of a comma, we have this case."

In the case known as O'Connor v. Oakhurst Dairy, a federal court of appeals was required to interpret a statute under which the "canning, processing, preserving, freezing, drying, marketing, storing, packing for shipment or distribution" of certain goods were activities exempted from the general requirement of overtime pay; the question was whether this list included the distribution of the goods, or only the packing of the goods for distribution. The lack of a comma suggested one meaning, while the omission of the conjunction or before "packing" and the fact that the Maine Legislative Drafting Manual advised against use of the serial comma suggested another. It said "Although authorities on punctuation may differ, when drafting Maine law or rules, don’t use a comma between the penultimate and the last item of a series." In addition to the absence of a comma, the fact that the word chosen was "distribution" rather than "distributing" was also a consideration, as was the question of whether it would be reasonable to consider the list to be an asyndetic list (a list in which the coordinating conjunction is absent). Truck drivers demanded overtime pay, and the defense conceded that the expression was ambiguous, but said it should be interpreted as exempting distribution activity from overtime pay. The district court agreed with the defense and held that "distribution" was an exempt activity. On appeal, however, the First Circuit decided that the sentence was ambiguous and "because, under Maine law, ambiguities in the state's wage and hour laws must be construed liberally in order to accomplish their remedial purpose", adopted the drivers' narrower reading of the exemption and ruled that those who distributed the goods were entitled to overtime pay. Oakhurst Dairy settled the case by paying $5 million to the drivers, and the phrase in the law in question was later changed to use serial semicolons and "distributing" resulting in "canning; processing; preserving; freezing; drying; marketing; storing; packing for shipment; or distributing".

The opinion in the case said that 43 of the 50 U.S. states had mandated the use of a serial comma and that both chambers of the federal congress had warned against omitting it, in the words of the U.S. House Legislative Counsel's Manual on Drafting Style, "to prevent any misreading that the last item is part of the preceding one"; only seven states "either do not require or expressly prohibited the use of the serial comma".

British 50p Brexit coin
In 2020 a commemorative 50p coin was brought into circulation in the United Kingdom to mark "Brexit day", January 31, 2020, minted with the phrase "Peace, prosperity and friendship with all nations". English novelist Philip Pullman and others criticized the omission of the Oxford comma, while others said it was an Americanism and not required in this instance.

See also 
 Roger Casement, "hanged on a comma" due to contested non-punctuation in a law
 "Oxford Comma", a 2008 song by Vampire Weekend which begins "Who gives a fuck about an Oxford comma?"
 Syndeton, the conjunctive phrasing that may or may not contain a serial comma

References 

American and British English differences
Punctuation
Punctuation of English
English usage controversies